The Tesla Roadster is an all-electric battery-powered four-seater all-wheel-drive sports car concept in development by Tesla, Inc. Tesla said that it will be capable of accelerating from  in 1.9 seconds, which would be quicker than any street-legal production car as of the announcement in 2017. The Roadster is the successor to Tesla's first production car, the 2008 Roadster.

Tesla CEO Elon Musk has said that the Roadster should ship in 2023. Musk said in a tweet that higher-performance trim levels will be available beyond the base specifications, including a SpaceX package that would "include ~10 small rocket cold air thrusters arranged seamlessly around the car" which would supposedly allow for dramatic improvements in "acceleration, top speed, braking & cornering" such as a claimed 1.1 second 0–60 mph (0–97 km/h) time.

Overview

History 
In 2011, at the end of the production run of the original Tesla Roadster, Elon Musk suggested that a new version of the Roadster, without the Lotus chassis, would return to production by 2014. The new Roadster was first teased in 2014. At the time, it was also referred to as the Tesla Model R.

In 2015, Musk suggested a new Roadster, capable of faster acceleration. A tweet by Elon Musk in December 2016 reconfirmed a second Roadster was in the works, but still "some years away". The second Roadster was designed by Franz von Holzhausen.

A prototype of the Roadster was shown in a surprise moment at the end of the Tesla Semi event on November 16, 2017, with an announced availability in the year 2020 at the starting price of $200,000. Musk explained the concept as: "The point of doing this is to give a hardcore smackdown to gasoline cars. Driving a gasoline sports car is going to feel like a steam engine with a side of quiche." Test rides were given at the event for those who immediately paid the first $5,000 of a $50,000 deposit to pre-order the vehicle. Additional information followed after the teaser, such as the various world-record speeds Tesla said it will break.

In June 2018, Elon Musk revealed a potential feature called "SpaceX option package" for the Roadster. This would add around ten cold gas thrusters to the car to improve maneuverability; it would comprise an electric pump to recharge an air tank used to provide compressed air flowing through propelling nozzles to generate a cold jet thrust. The air tanks, based on "composite overwrapped pressure vessel" (COPV) also used in the Falcon 9 and Falcon Heavy rockets, would replace the back seats. The thrusters would be used to improve cornering, acceleration, top speed, and braking. Working pressure would be .

During the 2020 second quarter financial results conference call, Elon Musk stated that Tesla plans to tentatively build the Roadster in California and production would be in the next 12 to 18 months. The start of production would be mid to late 2021.

In January 2021, Elon Musk tweeted that production would be delayed until 2022. He commented that in 2021, the company would finish engineering the Roadster with the goal of having a "candidate design drivable late summer". In September 2021, Musk said that production would be delayed until 2023. Musk further confirmed the 2023 target at The 2021 Shareholder Meeting in October.

Pre-order marketing 
Pre-orders of the Roadster began in 2017, with a US$50,000 deposit required. Tesla owners taking part in the referral promotion program began accumulating discounts toward the purchase of a Roadster based on the number of referrals. Those reaching 55 confirmed referrals obtained a 100% rebate toward a future Roadster purchase.

Price 
The base model was initially listed on Tesla's website at US$200,000, but the first 1,000 to be produced, known as the Founder's Series, will be priced at $250,000. Full payment would be required to pre-order the latter vehicle. The price was later removed from the website, leaving only the deposit/reservation price of the base model as US$50,000.

Design 

The second-generation Tesla Roadster is a 2+2 coupé with a removable glass roof. It was designed by Franz von Holzhausen, Tesla's chief designer who has also been responsible for most earlier vehicles made by Tesla Motors. The Roadster has a 2+2 seating arrangement, with smaller rear seats for two passengers.

The Roadster has three electric motors, one in front and two at the rear, allowing for all-wheel drive, and torque vectoring during cornering. Tesla said that the vehicle will have a  battery, twice the capacity of the largest battery in an existing Tesla car (in the Tesla Model S or Model X Performance or Long Range Plus). Tesla has said that the Roadster will have a  range on a single charge at highway speeds. The rear wheels are larger than the front wheels.

Performance 

The following claims have been made by Musk for the prototype Roadster's acceleration:
  in 1.1 seconds with a rocket thruster option added (without specifying if this includes a 1-foot rollout).
  in 2.1 seconds for the base model before adding rocket thruster option (without specifying if this includes a 1-foot rollout or not). Tesla's website later claimed 1.9 seconds.

Its claimed  time will be 8.88 seconds, with a top speed above . Referring to the performance, Musk stated, "this is what we are achieving in the prototype"; he also indicated the performance may improve in the production model and that the stated numbers refer to the anticipated "base model".

Analysis
Research completed by Bloomberg L.P. indicates that the estimate as to the range per charge is optimistic, based on comments from Salim Morsy, the electric vehicle analyst at Bloomberg New Energy Finance. In an article titled Tesla's Newest Promises Break the Laws of Batteries, Morsy indicated that the claimed battery capacity would require batteries that would be too large for the Roadster's small frame. "I don't think the car you saw last week had the full 200 kilowatt hours in it. I don't think it's physically possible to do that right now." Morsy's analysis directly contradicts Musk, who stated "this is what we are achieving in the prototype".

He added that the feasibility of the acceleration claim assumed suitable tires would be available for the required traction.

Series 4, episode 12 of Jay Leno's Garage broadcast on August 23, 2018 featured Jay Leno inside the Tesla Roadster prototype along with its designer Franz von Holzhausen.

See also
 
 
 
  (Concept Two)
 Lotus Evija

References

External links

 

Electric concept cars
Electric sports cars
Rocket cars
Roadsters
Roadster 2020
Cars introduced in 2017